The Bronx River Parkway (sometimes abbreviated as the Bronx Parkway) is a  long parkway in downstate New York in the United States. It is named for the nearby Bronx River, which it parallels. The southern terminus of the parkway is at Story Avenue near the Bruckner Expressway in the Bronx neighborhood of Soundview. The northern terminus is at the Kensico Circle in Valhalla, Mount Pleasant, Westchester County, where the parkway connects to the Taconic State Parkway and, via a short connector, New York State Route 22 (NY 22). Within the Bronx, the parkway is maintained by the New York State Department of Transportation and is designated New York State Route 907H (NY 907H), an unsigned reference route. In Westchester County, the parkway is maintained by the Westchester County Department of Public Works and is designated unsigned County Route 9987 (CR 9987).

Most of the exits on the parkway, including the traffic light-controlled intersections in Westchester County, have interchange numbers. The term "Bronx River Parkway" originally referred to the Bronx River Reservation, New York's first linear park, of which the road is a portion, from the Bronx–Westchester county line to Kensico Dam Plaza.  Current usage of the term is confined to the roadway, but extends it to the portion which now continues southward beyond the Reservation.  Its northern terminus ends with a rotary near the Kensico Dam with exits for the Taconic State Parkway and Route 22.

Route description
The southern third of the parkway, in the Bronx, is exclusively limited-access. It serves as a commuter route, intersecting several major east–west routes. Halfway through the borough it begins to closely parallel the Harlem Line of Metro-North Railroad, a pairing which continues to the road's northern terminus.

In Westchester County, the road continues to have the same character until the Sprain Brook Parkway splits off at Bronxville, allowing most through traffic to bypass White Plains. The stretches north of that junction have more of the original park character, and are still used that way. North of White Plains the exits are at-grade intersections with traffic lights.

The Bronx
The parkway begins at Story Avenue in the neighborhood of Soundview in the Bronx, where two roadways merge near Metcalf and Morrison Avenues. Immediately to the north is the cloverleaf interchange at the Bruckner Expressway (Interstate 278 or I-278), where most traffic enters the parkway. Basketball courts and baseball fields flank the highway in the strip of parkland as the road leads to the north, slightly northwestward. North of Watson Avenue, within a half-mile (1 km) of the southern terminus, an on-ramp carries northbound traffic from Metcalf. The corresponding offramp for southbound traffic merges onto Harrod Avenue north of Westchester Avenue.

Now in West Farms, the Bronx River Parkway has an onramp to the southbound lanes from East 174th Street. North of it is exit 4, the interchange with the Cross Bronx Expressway (I-95). The single ramp of exit 5 allows southbound traffic to follow East 177th Street to the northern terminus of NY 895 (Sheridan Boulevard) and the Triborough Bridge. North of the interchange the road veers to the northeast slightly and crosses the railroad tracks of Amtrak's Northeast Corridor line. At East 180th Street, the linear park ends temporarily. After crossing the yard, wooded surroundings resume as the parkway follows the eastern edge of the Bronx Zoo in the Bronx Park neighborhood and the Bronx River, which gives the road its name, begins to follow it on the west. On the northbound side, as it enters the park, is an unnumbered exit allowing authorized vehicles (like those of people working at the NYC Parks Department) access to local streets via Birchall Avenue.

A quarter-mile to the north is the main exit for the zoo at Boston Road, with access to Boston Road (U.S. Route 1 or US 1 northbound) for northbound traffic, then the full cloverleaf at Pelham Parkway, where traffic can join US 1 southbound on Fordham Road. Past the exit the large wooded area on the west is the New York Botanical Garden, a National Historic Landmark (NHL). One half-mile (1 km) further north, exit 8 allows access to the Mosholu Parkway and Allerton Avenue. At the next exit, Gun Hill Road, the Williamsbridge station serving that neighborhood on Metro-North Railroad's Harlem Line, which closely parallels the parkway from this point on, is located immediately west of the highway. The railroad tracks join the river and the parkland in paralleling the road north as it continues straight along the east edge of Woodlawn Cemetery, another NHL.

Almost a mile and a half to the north, the Woodlawn station is located at the northeast corner of the cemetery next to the East 233rd Street exit. The highway bends left and then right again, crossing the river and the railroad, near the split along the tracks between the Harlem and New Haven lines immediately north of the station. After the curves, the Bronx River Parkway crosses the county line into Westchester County at the McLean Avenue/Nereid Avenue overpass and leaves the Bronx.

Westchester County
Once across the county line the parkway is in Yonkers, close to its boundary with Mount Vernon. A southbound exit, 10C, serves Bronx River Road at Wakefield Avenue near that train station a quarter-mile (500 m) north of the county line, even though the station is in the Bronx and the Harlem Line enters Westchester north of it. Northound traffic has 10A, for Mount Vernon Avenue and Yonkers Avenue at the Mount Vernon West station three-quarters of a mile to the north. Another southbound exit, 10B, serves Bronx River Road just to the north at its Mile Square Road and Winfred Avenue intersections. The park widens around the highway as it bends slightly, heading even more to the northeast. Just past this is exit 11, the Cross County Parkway, where the road swings toward the east to allow space for the complex of onramps that also allow access to Broad Street and the Fleetwood station. A half-mile north of that junction, the parkland and the roadway narrow as Bronxville becomes the community on the opposite side of the Bronx River.

The road then turns sharply to the northwest, away from the Harlem Line. Vehicles continuing are now on the Sprain Brook Parkway, for which this is the southern terminus; traffic for the BRP must exit. The exit numbers reset; the new exit 1, Paxton Avenue in Bronxville, is on the northbound lanes just north of the split (exit 1A allows southbound traffic to leave the parkway for Desmond Avenue just before merging). Exit 2, West Pondfield Road, also northbound-only, is a thousand feet (300 m) to the north as the highway curves around downtown Bronxville to the east. Here, the road runs through the Armour Villa neighborhood until it runs under the Tuckahoe Road bridge. Almost a mile (1.6 km) separates it from the next exit, at Elm Street in Tuckahoe. The park continues to parallel the parkway, with paved bike paths and a large pond. A thousand feet to the north, Scarsdale Road is the first at-grade interchange, and the parkway then turns sharply to the east, then back to the northeast more gradually. Exit 8, Thompson Street, serves the nearby Crestwood station as the Harlem Line's tracks begin to parallel the road again. Another three-quarter mile north, after the road has resumed its northeast course, comes the next at-grade exit, Leewood Drive, on the northbound side.

A quarter-mile (500 m) to the north are abandoned parking lots on both sides that were once gas stations. One-tenth of a mile (150 m) to the north, the roadways diverge and the river runs between them. Just beyond this is another at-grade interchange, Strathmore and Harney roads. The roadways remain apart through a wooded section as they curve westward for the next three-quarter mile, returning to the highway's northeastern heading as it leaves Yonkers and briefly enters Greenburgh south of the southbound Ardsley Road exit east of downtown Scarsdale. Just after it curves eastward again and crosses the Harlem Line, entering Scarsdale, traffic can enter and exit at Crane Road and East Parkway with southbound traffic using a light to cross over the northbound lanes and no entrance onto the southbound lanes. In the next  stretch, there are exits for Ogden and Butler roads from the northbound lanes. Fenimore Road, just east of the Hartsdale and its train station, is a northbound exit with southbound entry. Just to its north, southbound traffic can exit onto Greenacres Avenue. The parkway begins heading even more to the northeast, the tracks immediately adjacent, past northbound exits for River and Claremont roads.

Just north of the latter exit, the highway enters White Plains, the Westchester county seat. After the northbound Walworth crossing exit, it turns northwest across the river and the tracks and then resumes its northeasterly course. A half-mile (1 km) north it reaches the Main Street (NY 119) northbound exit/southbound entrance, just west of the White Plains station on the west side of heavily developed downtown White Plains. It bends north and then northwest to the first of several at-grade intersections with traffic lights, also signed and numbered as exits, with Central Avenue (NY 100), at the Westchester County Center. From here parkway traffic is also directed toward the nearby Cross-Westchester Expressway (I-287) via NY 119, as the parkway has no direct interchange with it.

Beyond it the parkway goes due north before curving slightly into the Fisher Lane intersection just west of the last Metro-North station along the parkway, North White Plains. The Maryton and Virginia Road intersections follow, spaced roughly a thousand feet (300 m) apart. Another thousand feet from that intersection, the highway turns to the northeast again as the roadways diverge and cross the Harlem Line and the Bronx River for the last time. Northbound traffic has the last exit, exit 27, onto Washington Avenue. Kensico Dam is visible in the distance as the parkway reaches its northern terminus at Kensico Circle, southern terminus of the Taconic State Parkway, also listed on the Register.

A seven-mile (11 km) section of the Bronx River Parkway in Westchester County south of White Plains is closed to motorist traffic from 10 AM to 2 PM select Sundays in May, June and September (with the exception of Memorial and Labor Day weekends), allowing bicyclists to venture along the scenic road. Another section north of the one reserved for bicyclists is reserved for inline skating.

History

Construction began in Westchester County in 1907, making it the earliest limited-access automobile highway to start construction. However, although construction on the Long Island Motor Parkway began a year later, a section of the Long Island road opened for traffic before the end of 1908, opening before the Bronx River Parkway as the first limited access automobile highway to be put into use. Neither was up to modern freeway standards, utilizing left turns across the opposing direction at access points.

The Bronx River Parkway was the first highway to utilize a median strip to separate the opposing lanes, the first highway constructed through a park, and the first highway where intersecting streets crossed over bridges.

The Westchester section of the Bronx River Parkway first opened to traffic in 1922 and was completed in 1925. A new roadway in the New York City borough of the Bronx including an extension south of the former Botanical Gardens/Burke Avenue terminus opened in 1951. That extension diverges eastward from the river.

From 1953 to 1955, a  segment of the parkway between Bronxville and the Bronx was closed to straighten and widen the road.  During this reconstruction period, a new overpass was also built for the Cross County Parkway.

In 1957, a half mile stretch of the Parkway between Woodland Viaduct in White Plains and the Scarsdale border was reconstructed to eliminate sharp dips and twists that purportedly provided a "roller coaster-like" effect for drivers.

Late exit modifications
During the 1960s and since then an entrance and exit on the northbound side between current exits 5 and 6 in the Bronx, and an associated U-turn from southbound to northbound, formerly open to general traffic, were reserved for official use by police and the Parks Dept. which maintains an office there. This was around the time other U-turns were being eliminated from various parkways in New York City.

A gas station in the wide median between Bronx exits 7 and 8, north of the pedestrian overpass to the Botanical Garden, was closed due to fire in the early 1980s and has since been razed and the median relandscaped. Of a pair of former gas stations on the outer margins of the roadway in Westchester near Crestwood, the southbound one is currently being used as a Westchester County Police Sub-Station, and the northbound used only as a tourist information stand.

The interchange with the Cross County Parkway did not provide direct access to and from both directions of the latter until extra ramps and an extra overpass were provided beginning in the 1970s. The original interchange is now exit 11W.

In 2009 the northbound exit ramp to Oak Street in Yonkers was replaced by an exit to Yonkers Avenue, a block to the south. From 2012 to 2015, a realignment and bridge replacement project was carried out in Scarsdale.

Truncation and extension
The Bronx River Parkway originally went beyond its northern terminus at Kensico Circle to NY Route 22 northbound. Today, the most obvious route through the circle leads motorists directly to and from the Taconic State Parkway, and the way to NY 22 northbound is considered to be a little spur off the circle. This spur from the Kensico Circle to NY 22 is unsigned CR 68.  Prior to heightened security measures enacted post-September 11 motorists could take the road that leads towards NY 22 and then drive across the top of the Kensico Dam and eventually re-connect with the Taconic State Parkway.

An extension from the southern terminus in the Bronx into Soundview Park was proposed until the 1970s.

Westchester designation
The southernmost portion of the parkway in Westchester, south of the Sprain, is internally designated as NY 907G, an unsigned reference route, in apparent violation of the numbering standard. Ordinarily, the second digit should be the region. New York City and Long Island, regions 10 and 11, share 0; Westchester is region 8 (the Hutchinson River Parkway also shares this oddity). The section south of here is marked only with reference markers, and the section north only with county mileposts. This middle section has county mileposts in the middle, and reference markers with state mileposts (counting from the southern terminus in the Bronx, not the city line) alongside. However, Reference Route 907G is no longer listed in the NYSDOT traffic counts and the entirety of the parkway in the county is considered a county route by Westchester County.

The parkway was documented by the Historic American Engineering Record in 2001. Drawings and photographs from the documentation project were made available through the Westchester County Archives, winning an award of excellence from the Lower Hudson Conference.

Exit list

See also

 List of county routes in Westchester County, New York
 National Register of Historic Places listings in Bronx County, New York
 National Register of Historic Places listings in northern Westchester County, New York
 National Register of Historic Places listings in southern Westchester County, New York

References

Further reading

External links

 Bronx River Parkway
 
 History of Scenic Road Programs - New York: Westchester County Parkways
 Bronx Parkway (Greater New York Roads)

Parkways in New York City
Transportation in Westchester County, New York
Transportation in Yonkers, New York
Parkways in New York (state)
Transportation in the Bronx
Parks on the National Register of Historic Places in New York City
National Register of Historic Places in the Bronx
National Register of Historic Places in Westchester County, New York
Historic American Engineering Record in New York (state)
Roads on the National Register of Historic Places in New York (state)
Parks on the National Register of Historic Places in New York (state)